Speocropia is a genus of moths of the family Noctuidae.

Species
 Speocropia aenyra (Druce, 1890)
 Speocropia chromatica Hampson, 1908
 Speocropia leucosticta Hampson, 1908
 Speocropia mamestroides E. D. Jones, 1914
 Speocropia randa (Schaus, 1906)
 Speocropia scriptura (Walker, 1858)
 Speocropia trichoma (Herrich-Schäffer, 1868)

Former species
 Speocropia fernae is now Phosphila fernae (Benjamin, 1933)

References

Hadeninae